Talk to Me is a 1984 independent drama film directed by Julius Potocsny and starring character actor Austin Pendleton in a rare leading role on film, and co-starring Michael Murphy, Barbara Eda-Young, Dan Shor, Michael Tolan and a special appearance cameo by Louise Fletcher.  The film was produced by Hollins Communications Institution to benefit the American Institute for Stuttering, of which Pendleton was a graduate.

Sources 
http://www.rottentomatoes.com/m/1020852-talk_to_me/
http://stuttertalk.com/2009/07/08/austin-pendleton-stuttering.aspx
http://www.film.com/movies/mediaplayback/talk-to-me/27516369
https://web.archive.org/web/20121019121618/http://stutteringtreatment.org/aboutstaff.php

External links 

1984 films
Atlantic Entertainment Group films
1984 drama films
American drama films
1980s English-language films
1980s American films